The Muscovite–Ukrainian War (1658–1659) was an armed conflict from September 21, 1658, to October 17, 1659, between the Cossack Hetmanate led by Ivan Vyhovsky and the Tsardom of Muscovy. It began with Muscovite intervention in internal Ukrainian struggles. Military action was conducted in left-bank Ukraine, east of the Dnieper.

Vyhovsky left the Moscow protectorate during the war, passing (in accordance with the Treaty of Hadiach) as the third equal member ("Grand Duchy of Russia") of the bilateral union of Poland and Lithuania into the Polish–Lithuanian Commonwealth. In the 1659 battle of Konotop, the Ukrainian Cossacks and their allies (the Crimean Tatars) defeated the main elements of the Muscovite army but could not capitalize on the victory. Vyhovsky's unpopular alliance with the Poles deprived him of most Cossack support, especially the Zaporozhian Sich and the left-bank regiments. He ceded to new hetman Yuri Khmelnytsky, who terminated the Hadiach agreement and made peace with Moscow. The war ended with the Pereyaslav Articles, which established a Muscovite protectorate of Cossack Ukraine.

Tsardom of Muscovy politics

On October 24, 1656, the Tsar of Moscow concluded a truce with the Polish-Lithuanian Commonwealth in which Ukraine became a commonwealth protectorate. A Cossack officer was persuaded to oppose Hetman Vyhovsky, and Moscow ambassadors were sent with generous gifts and promises to the Zaporozhian Sich and the colonels.

During the life of Hetman Bohdan Khmelnytsky, Muscovy began to violate the terms of the March Articles. The tsar of Muscovy and the government viewed the 1654 treaty as the annexation of Ukraine. Khmelnytsky and most Cossack officers saw the agreement as a military-political union of equals. The Ukrainian leadership and Khmelnytsky consistently opposed the restriction of international relations of the hetman's government and the collection of taxes. The Moscow government was dissatisfied with being prevented from establishing control of the hetmanate. Khmelnytsky's July 27, 1657 death was perceived in Moscow as a signal to take decisive action to consolidate its position in Ukraine.

On August 11 of that year, the tsar of Moscow sent ambassador Vasyl Kikin to Ukraine to announce that tsarist boyar Prince Aleksey Trubetskoy was coming to Ukraine to organize the election of a new hetman. The Cossacks were also informed that tsarist warlords would assume administrative, arbitrative, and judicial functions and begin preparing for the introduction of Moscow's government in Ukraine. The independence of the Ukrainian Orthodox Church (UOC) was also undermined. The Ukrainian clergy campaigned for the subordination of the Kyiv metropolitanate to the authority of the Moscow patriarch, and demanded that a new Kyiv metropolitan would not be elected without Moscow representatives. Although the treaty of 1654 did not mention subordinating the UOC to Moscow, Kyiv Metropolitan Sylvester Kosiv and most Orthodox clergy refused to swear allegiance to the Moscow tsar.

Cossack officers and citizens held elections for hetman at the Rada according to Cossack tradition, not organized by the Moscow government and without Trubetskoy's participation. On August 26, Ivan Vyhovsky was elected hetman of the Zaporozhian Army. Vyhovsky and the officers were ordered to prepare supplies for the troops of Grigory Romodanovsky, whom Moscow sent to Ukraine against Chyhyryn's will. Requests by the tsarist government to reconsider relations were rejected at the Cossack Council in Korsun.

Pushkar-Barabash uprising
At the end of December 1657, Poltava colonel Martyn Pushkar and his regiment opposed the hetman with Muskovite support. Belgorod warlord  and Kolontaiv warlord David Protasov were imprisoned. Bogdan Khitrovo, the tsar's ambassador who supported the anti-Hetman rebels, began to demand Moscow garrisons in Chernihiv, Nizhyn, Pereiaslav and other cities from Hetman Vyhovsky in February 1658.

On April 3 and 4, 1658, tsarist decrees appointed warlords in Bila Tserkva, Korsun, Nizhyn, Poltava, Chernihiv, and Myrhorod; on April 6, a decree appointed boyar Vasily Borisovich Sheremetev head of the new Moscow administration in Ukraine. Sheremetev was instructed to transfer administration to the bourgeoisie, which favored the autocratic tsarist government. The opposition of city authorities to the Cossack administration also undermined Cossack state power.

In the Battle of Poltava, Hetman Vyhovsky's troops defeated the rebels and Pushkar was killed. Realizing the impossibility of ending the civil war in Ukraine with diplomacy, Moscow introduced troops into the Hetmanate. In mid-June 1658, Sheremetyev arrived in Kyiv; Grigory Romodanovsky arrived in Vepryk with 15,000 troops on June 28.

The 1657–1658 Pushkar-Barabash uprising was supported by the Moscow authorities and Moscow warlords in Ukraine. After the tsar refused Vyhovsky help against the rebels, the hetman began looking for other options. The Crimean Khanate had had an alliance with the Polish-Lithuanian Commonwealth since 1654, and it was decided to resume negotiations with the commonwealth; this resulted in the Treaty of Hadiach. The new union of Ukraine and the commonwealth was based on the commonwealth's federal system, which was implemented with the 1569 Union of Lublin. Ukraine was an independent state as the Grand Duchy of Russia, on equal terms with Poland and Lithuania in the federation. The agreement was criticized in Moscow.

In August 1658, ignoring the Pereiaslav Agreement, Romodanovsky named Ivan Bezpaly acting hetman. Moscow's troops and their allies treated left-bank Ukraine like an occupied country. Yakiv Barabash and his men began to ravage the left-bank cities, and Moscow hostages were sent there without the consent of the Ukrainian government. In Pryluky, Colonel Petro Doroshenko was illegally removed and several officers loyal to the hetman's government were executed.

Beginning
In response to the military actions of the Moscow warlord, the hetman's government took military action on Moscow territory. In August and September 1658, the hetman's troops went to the Ukrainian-Moscow border. Colonel Ivan Nechai launched military operations against the Muscovites in Belarus.

War was declared by both parties in September 1658. The Ukrainian government then concluded the Treaty of Hadiach with the Polish-Lithuanian Commonwealth (removing the hetman's state from tsarist citizenship), and issued a manifesto to the rulers of Europe explaining the cause of its war with Muscovy. The treaty created the Grand Duchy of Russia, one of the commonwealth's three parts. The highest power in Ukraine belonged to the hetman and the Grand Council; Ukraine had its own court (where all cases were conducted in Ukrainian), its own tax collection, and its own warlord (the Cossack army). The tsar issued a September 21, 1658 letter calling for the removal of the head of the Ukrainian state, and announced the beginning of hostilities against the hetman's troops. A tsarist army estimated at 70,000 to 100,000 troops entered Ukraine.

Stages

First stage
The war's first stage was fought from late September to mid-December 1658. Colonel Nechay's troops drove the Moscow garrisons from the cities of Belarus. On October 20, a 15,000-strong Moscow army led by Prince Romodanovsky entered Ukraine for the third time to establish Muscovy military control of the southern and central left bank.

Hetman Vyhovsky divided his army in two. Colonels Hryhoriy Hulyanytskyi, Petro Doroshenko, and Onykyi Sylych begin hostilities against Romodanovsky's army in the Pyriatyn area, and the hetman traveled to Kyiv to drive out the Moscow garrison. The defeat of the hetman's troops on October 30 near Kyiv, Romodanovsky's siege by Cossack troops led by Gulyanytsky in Varva, and the lack of resources and support from the local population forced the parties to conclude a truce.

Moscow troops captured the town of Chornukha, on the road from Pyriatyn to Lokhvytsia, in November. Under the terms of the armistice, Prince Romodanovsky lifted the siege of Varva and retreated to Lokhvytsia. During the winter of 1658–1659, both sides were preparing to continue the war.

Second stage
The second stage was from mid-December 1658 to the second half of March 1659. In December 1658, regrouping its troops, the hetman's government seized the initiative and the main Moscow forces were blocked in Lokhvytsia. After receiving reinforcements from the Polish-Lithuanian Commonwealth and the Crimean Khanate, Vyhovsky went to the left bank to regain some control of the portions of the Poltava, Myrhorod, and Lubny regiments which had Moscow garrisons.

The winter and the first half of March 1659 were spent in clashes between the hetman's and Moscow's troops in the border areas and periodic clashes near Kyiv. During the campaign, the hetman's government regained control of most of the regiments' territory. Vyhovsky was unable to achieve victory, however, since about 10 Ukrainian cities remained under Moscow's control.

Third stage
The third stage (late March to early August 1659) began with a late-March Muscovite campaign in Ukraine led by Aleksey Trubetskoy. Trubetskoy's army (about 70,000 troops) approached Konotop, a strategically-important border city near Putyvl, on April 18. Konotop housed the hetman's most capable left-bank troops: three Cossack regiments (Nizhyn, Chernihiv and Kalnytsky) led by northern hetman Hryhoriy Hulyanytsky. Konotop was under siege on April 21, but the Cossacks refused to surrender the city. In May, Trubetskoy launched additional raids on the hetman's troops.

Victory

In June 1659, battles between Muscovite troops and the hetman's were fought in the Glukhov area. Putyvl and Severian warlords Hryhoriy Dolgoruky and Mykhailo Dmytriyev besieged the city for over two weeks before the siege was lifted. Muscovite troops were defeated by a combined Cossack-Tatar army near Govtva and, decisively, in Konotop. The hetman was accompanied by 16,000 Cossacks, 3,000 Poles, Serbs and Wallachians, and 30,000 to 40,000 Tatars.

On June 28, Muscovite and Cossack-Tatar troops met at Sosnivka crossing. Muscovy was defeated; Trubetskoy was ordered to retreat from Konotop, the siege of the city was lifted, and the convoys were removed. The following day, Hetman Vyhovsky approached Konotop with his main forces and laid siege to the Muscovite camp. Wanting to save his remaining troops and escape from the encirclement, Trubetskoy began retreating towards Putyvl on July 2. Two days later, Muscovite troops left the hetmanate.

Aftermath

According to the journal of a Swedish diplomat, news of the Muscovite defeat at Konotop, the possibility of a further offensive, and the threat of a Tatar attack on Muscovy cities caused panic in Moscow. Russian historian Sergei Solovyov wrote,
The elite Moscow cavalry, which participated in the successful campaigns of 1654 and 1655, died in one day; never after that was the tsar of Moscow able to bring such a brilliant army to the field. Tsar Alexei Mikhailovich came out to the people in mourning clothes, and terror gripped Moscow ...  

Tatar attacks in the southern regions of Muscovy in late July and early August captured over 25,000 people. Moscow's troops were driven out of Ukrainian territory, and the hetman's government offered the tsar a prisoner exchange. Its defeat forced Moscow to reconsider the issue of controlling Ukraine. Trubetskoy was ordered to send part of his regiments to Belgorod and withdraw from the border in late July to negotiate with the government of Cossack hetman Ivan Vyhovsky. However, the Ukrainians could not use the victory to strengthen their state. Due to internal strife and work by Muscovite ambassadors and warlords, Vyhovsky soon resigned and the Grand Duchy of Russia existed only on paper.

Mid-August to October 1659 were unfavorable for Ukraine. The political reorientation of most officers to Muscovy (the oath to the tsar and the call of the Muscovite army) due to their dissatisfaction with the version of the Treaty of Hadiach ratified by the Sejm of the Polish–Lithuanian Commonwealth superseded the Ukrainian army's military achievements. In September, Yurii Khmelnytsky replaced Vyhovsky as hetman and the Ukrainian Ruin began.

Victory in the war was replaced by political capitulation with the Pereiaslav Articles on October 17, 1659. Muscovy achieved most of its goals. By sending troops to the main cities of Ukraine, it established military and political control of the left bank, influenced the appointment of a hetman and other officers (reducing the power of the Cossack Rada, agreed with Cossack officers not to pursue foreign and domestic policies independent of Muscovy, and expelled the Cossack administration from Belarus.

References

External links 
 Бульвінський Андрій (канд. іст. наук) Перед Конотопом. Переможній козацько-татарській битві передувала українсько-російська війна 1658—1659 років // «Україна молода» No. 122 за 9 липня 2009 року
 Конотопська битва — зразок козацького воєнного мистецтва
 Слово Президента України з нагоди 350-річчя Конотопської битви
 Владислав Верстюк битва: перемога української зброї"
 Українсько-російська війна 1658—1659 рр..

Conflicts in 1658
Conflicts in 1659
1658 in Europe
1659 in Europe
1658 in Russia
1659 in Russia
17th-century military history of Russia
17th century in the Zaporozhian Host
Russian–Ukrainian wars
Wars of independence
Military operations involving the Crimean Khanate
17th century in the Crimean Khanate